The Evangelical Free Church of Geneva in French the Église évangélique libre de Genève is a Reformed free church in Geneva.
The church has 6 congregations in Onex, Versoix, Buix, Rive Droite, Carouge, l'Oratoire with a combined membership of 1,000.

The church was founded in 1849, in a period of spiritual renewal begun in the early 19th century. This movement began in the Church of Geneva, resulting a dismissal of several pastors. In the 1940s the church intended to merge with the Reformed church in Geneva, but this did was decline. In 1978 a new parish in Onex was formed. In 1994 a sixth paris was formed in Versoix.

The church is a member of the Federation of Swiss Protestant Churches, and it is the smallest member of the Federation. In the church there is a charismatic renewal, it is not a Pentecostal church but someone can hear people speaking tongues, and prophecy during worship.

References

External links 
Evangelical Free Church website

Christianity in Geneva